Sweet Smell of Success is a musical created by Marvin Hamlisch (music), Craig Carnelia (lyrics), and John Guare (book).  The show is based on the 1957 movie of the same name, which in turn was based on the 1955 novelette of the same name by Ernest Lehman. The show tells the story of a powerful newspaper columnist named J. J. Hunsecker (based on famed New York columnist Walter Winchell) who uses his connections to ruin his sister's relationship with a man he deems inappropriate.

It was a critical and commercial failure.

Production history 
A workshop was held in Toronto, Ontario, Canada in August 1998. According to a Livent spokesman "the show had a cast of 18, made up mainly of Canadians. The performers' names were not revealed." The workshop was directed by Nicholas Hytner. The workshop was followed by a reading in November 1998 in New York City, with Jonathan Pryce as J.J. Hunsecker, Brian d'Arcy James as Sidney, Anastasia Barzee, Patrick Wilson, Stacey Logan and an ensemble of 12.

It had a pre-Broadway tryout in Chicago, Illinois, in January 2002. Critics' reactions were not favorable. Chicago Tribune critic Chris Jones found that it had an "identity crisis" and warned that "...[b]etween now and the Broadway opening, director Nicholas Hytner and the other multitalented parties involved had better all get on the same conceptual page, or what’s left of the gossip column fraternity will have a lot to chew on."

Subsequently changes were made to the show, including a new ending.

Modifications to the plot and differences from the film reportedly reflect author Ernest Lehman's original intent. Lehman, the author of the original novelette, was a producer on the musical adaptation.

The musical opened on March 14, 2002 at the Martin Beck Theatre on Broadway. Again directed by Hytner, it closed on June 15, 2002, after 109 performances and 18 previews. The show starred John Lithgow as J.J. Hunsecker, and Brian d'Arcy James as Sidney Falcone.

The creative team included choreography by Christopher Wheeldon, sets and costumes by Bob Crowley, and lighting by Natasha Katz. Sweet Smell garnered 7 Tony Award nominations including Best Musical. John Lithgow received the show's only Tony Award, winning Best Performance by a Leading Actor in a Musical.

Synopsis

As taken from the original cast recording
Act I

In 1952 New York City, JJ Hunsecker (John Lithgow) rules it all with his daily gossip column in the New York Globe, syndicated to sixty million readers across America. JJ has the goods on everyone, from the President to the latest starlet. And everyone feeds JJ scandal, from J. Edgar Hoover and Senator Joe McCarthy down to a battalion of hungry press agents who attach their news to a client that JJ might plug. You’re no one if you’re not in JJ. You can become no one if JJ turns on you ("The Column").

Meet Sidney Falcone (Brian D'Arcy James), a struggling press agent whose sole client is a nowhere jazz dive, the Club Voodoo. Tony, the owner, gives Sidney an ultimatum. No item in JJ, no job. Tonight, the only customer at the Voodoo is Susan (Kelli O'Hara), a classy beauty, who's there to see Dallas (John E. Noseworthy Jr) the hot young piano player. It's his last night before going off to play a gig in Chicago. He wants Susan to go with him. She can’t. There's someone who wouldn’t like it.

Looking for a client - any client - Sidney offers his services to Dallas ("I Can Get You In JJ") Dallas laughs off Sidney's pitch. He will make it on his own. Sidney then turns to Susan and promises that, if she hires him, he’ll make her a star with one mention in JJ. She doesn’t bite. Sidney's taken with her but when he sees Dallas sing to Susan, he realizes he hasn’t a chance ("I Cannot Hear the City").

Suddenly JJ shows up at the Voodoo, knowing nothing of Dallas. He's followed Susan, furious that she walked out on him earlier at dinner at the Stork Club. Why is she in a dive like this? As Dallas moves to JJ to tell him why, Susan distracts JJ by introducing Sidney as the reason. She claims Sidney is her partner in acting class. Sidney is stunned. (He’d assumed Susan was JJ's girlfriend but finds out she's JJ's sister). Sidney goes along with the ruse. As JJ questions Sidney on his nightly crawl of every hotspot in Manhattan ("Welcome to the Night").

JJ buys Sidney a new suit, and gets Sidney's waitress girlfriend, Rita (Stacey Logan), a job at a fancy nightspot called the Cafe Elysian. JJ introduces Sidney to the powerful and sinister Police Detective Kello. JJ gets Sidney clients, and urges his new friend to “keep the ‘O’ and change his name to Falco.” Life’s great! ("Laughing All The Way To The Bank"). Sidney can’t believe his new friendship. The life he's dreamed of is here. ("At The Fountain").

Weeks later, before dawn, at St. Patrick's Cathedral, in the presence of the Almighty, it's payback time. JJ makes Sidney (the former altar-boy) swear he will follow Susan and report on all that he sees.

Susan and Dallas are in bed ("Don't Know Where You Leave Off") Susan's agonized. She can’t tell JJ about their romance. JJ would never accept her loving a nobody like Dallas. Dallas gives her an ultimatum. He's back from his latest gig in Philadelphia in three weeks. Tell JJ by then. Dallas says goodbye to Susan at Penn Station with an epic kiss, seen by Sidney. When Susan sees him, Sidney admits he's following her on JJ's behalf. He advises her to drop this nobody Dallas. Susan reminds Sidney how much she helped a nobody like him. In return, she asks Sidney to take on Dallas as a secret client and make him a somebody ("What If").

Susan takes Sidney home to JJ's penthouse. JJ regales Sidney with stories about Susie's childhood, their life together and how much everyone loves his little sister ("For Susan"). Sidney, seeing how oppressive JJ's love is to Susan, feeds JJ an item about a great young piano player named Dallas Cochran who needs a break. JJ will print it. Susan is silently grateful. When Sidney leaves, JJ asks Susan to dance like they used to when she was a little girl. When she rejects him, JJ suspects Susan of seeing someone and counts on Sidney to tell him who that someone is.

Thanks to JJ's rave, Dallas is in New York headlining at the hip Cafe Elysian ("One Track Mind"). JJ proudly introduces Susan to his discovery, Dallas. Then he sees Susan's loving reaction. Sidney tries to hustle JJ out of the club. Tony from the Voodoo has stopped by to see Dallas’ success, Tony unwittingly drops the bombshell that Susan and Dallas have been an item for a while. JJ is incensed at having been duped by Sidney. Nobody lies to JJ. Sidney is trapped.

Act II
As Act II opens, Sidney vows to JJ he’ll clear up this Susan/Dallas thing. Clear it up? JJ insists that he "Break It Up". Or else. And Susan must never know JJ's behind it.

Sidney tries every ploy he can think of to end the romance. Nothing works. Sidney's downfall is swift. He's blackballed from the column and loses all his clients. JJ, while pretending to be happy for Susan and Dallas, gives Sidney a deadline to demolish their relationship. By morning.

In desperation to get back into JJ's favor, Sidney tries to plant a vicious smear about Dallas in the column of a rival gossip monger, Otis Elwell. However, the repulsive Otis will only print the item for a price. Sidney realizes he has “the price” at home, where Sidney's girlfriend Rita is eagerly waiting for him ("Rita's Tune"). Sidney shows up with Elwell. His purpose is clear. Rita's revolted that Sidney would use her like this. Sidney needs Otis's column. He's desperate. He bullies and manipulates Rita into going along with his scheme. After Otis phones in Sidney's smear, Sidney leaves them together.

The public descends on the morning edition. They revel in how the item will ruin Dallas ("Dirt").

JJ is hosting a charity telethon. Susan comes backstage to show JJ the lie of a smear in a rival paper, and begs JJ for help. Sidney assures Susan that JJ will. Bring Dallas in. JJ is enraged. Sidney advises JJ to do what Susan wants, get Dallas his job back, then leave Dallas alone with him for five minutes. He will wind Dallas so tight that Dallas will snap, and the relationship with Susan will be over. JJ admires his protege. “You’re a cookie full of arsenic” JJ calls the Elysian and gets Dallas reinstated, then goes on with his telethon. Sidney then reveals to Dallas how he got his career-making gig ("I Could Get You In JJ" (reprise)). JJ returns in time to hear Dallas’ angry disbelief at Susan's deception. Dallas insults JJ and his column. Susan tells Dallas to leave. Sidney is triumphant. JJ tells Susan he's taking her to England for the coronation, immediately after the telethon. She agrees to go, then runs after Dallas. She tries to explain that he’ll never escape JJ's power. He won’t be safe ("I Can Hear the City" (reprise)).

JJ can’t forget Dallas’ insults. Not satisfied that Susan and Dallas have parted, JJ wants Sidney to “take Dallas apart”. Sidney doesn’t do stuff like that. Then JJ suggests Sidney call Lt. Kello to do it. Never. What if JJ gave Sidney his column, what then? JJ gives him Kello's number. While JJ performs his old vaudeville routine on the telethon ("Don't Look Now"), Sidney calls Kello and sets up Dallas to be brutally and lethally beaten.

Sidney informs JJ the deed is done. JJ announces to America that, while he's away in England, Sidney will write the column. Sidney's at the pinnacle ("At The Fountain" (reprise)).

Susan interrupts his victory. She tells him Dallas has been found. Sidney won’t let her miss that boat. JJ waits impatiently at the dock. Susan refuses to get on board. She produces Rita as a witness who saw Sidney plant drugs on Dallas and signal Kello for the attack. JJ feigns shock that Sidney would do such a thing. Otis Elwell appears. Susan has called him with a  story. Sidney and JJ are terrified. The story is that she and Dallas are going to marry and leave New York. Yes, Dallas is alive. Otis goes, grateful for the scoop. Susan tells JJ that he’ll never see her again. If he ever comes after her, she’ll tell every columnist in town what JJ and Sidney did to Dallas. “I always wondered which of your enemies would bring you down. I never dreamed it could be me.” She leaves.

Sidney urges JJ to get on the boat. JJ wants Sidney to get rid of Rita. Rita knows too much. “Do it and the column is yours.” Sidney rebels. Sidney will take Rita to a place where nobody ever heard of JJ. JJ smiles. No such place exists. Sidney runs. He sees hungry press agents, desperate to get in the column, the hysterical crowds in the nightclubs, hoping for a mention in JJ. Sidney is finally free of it all. Kello and his goons appear. They surround Sidney.

JJ goes back to work, preparing his next column ("Finale"). The lead item announces the death of Sidney Falco in a vicious robbery. But Sidney would be happy. He made today's column.

Cast and characters

Musical numbers
Source: Playbill

Act I
 "The Column" - J.J., Sidney, and Ensemble
 "I Could Get You in J.J." - Sidney
 "I Cannot Hear the City" - Dallas
 "Welcome to the Night" - J.J., Sidney, and Ensemble
 "Laughin' All the Way to the Bank" - Club Zanzibar Singer
 "At the Fountain" - Sidney
 "Psalm 151" † - J.J. and Sidney
 "Don't Know Where You Leave Off" - Dallas and Susan
 "What If" - Susan and Ensemble
 "For Susan" - J.J.
 "One Track Mind" - Dallas
 "Act I Finale" † - Ensemble

Act II
 "Break It Up" - J.J., Sidney, and Ensemble
 "Rita's Tune" - Rita
 "Dirt" - Ensemble
 "I Could Get You in J.J." (Reprise) - Sidney
 "I Cannot Hear the City" (Reprise) - Susan and Dallas
 "Don't Look Now" - J.J. and Ensemble
 "At the Fountain" (Reprise) - Sidney and Ensemble
 "Act II Finale" - J.J., Susan, Sidney, and Ensemble

† Not included on the Original Broadway Cast Recording (2002)

Awards and nominations

Original Broadway production

Reception
Despite eager anticipation, the musical version received largely negative reviews and it was a commercial flop. Reportedly, it lost its entire $10 million investment. One critic lamented that it was "a real heartbreaker; one of those fabulous sounding new musicals with an impeccable pedigree which never quite comes together and ultimately only disappoints."

A 2012 London production of the musical met with mixed reviews. Theatre critic Lyn Gardner of The Guardian praised the score and choreography but found that it: "sugars the pill and never locates the savage, cynical heart... It wants to be a straightforward song-and-dance show – the problem is, this piece is anything but."

References

External links
 

2002 musicals
Broadway musicals
Musicals based on films
Musicals by Marvin Hamlisch
Tony Award-winning musicals